Space (also known as James A. Michener's Space) is a 1985 American television miniseries starring James Garner as Sen. Norman Grant.  It is based on the 1982 novel of the same name by James A. Michener that aired on CBS.  Like the novel, the miniseries is a fictionalised history of the United States space program.

Space won an Emmy Award, for film sound mixing. It originally aired from April 14 through 18, 1985, and consisted of five parts running a total of 13 hours. In subsequent showings, it was cut to nine hours.

Characters
Norman Grant (James Garner) is a former war hero turned senator who tirelessly promotes the American space program despite almost insurmountable opposition. Other principal players include John Pope (Harry Hamlin), who, after failing to win his way to Annapolis, matriculates from a Navy recruit to a naval officer, Naval Aviator, test pilot and pioneering astronaut in the company of fellow space-traveler Randy Claggett (Beau Bridges); Penny Hardesty Pope (Blair Brown), an ambitious and beautiful counsel to Senator Grant since his election and wife of John Pope; Leopold Strabismus (David Dukes), a hedonistic wheeler-dealer who hopes to capitalize on the 1947 UFO scare; German rocket scientist Dieter Kolff (Michael York), whose ideals (or lack thereof) are put to the test when he shifts his allegiance from the Nazis to the Americans; and Stanley Mott (Bruce Dern), an aeronautical engineer whose secret assignment is to make certain that men like Kolff aren't snatched up by the Soviets after the fall of Germany.

Cast and crew

Cast
 James Garner as Senator Norman Grant
 Beau Bridges as Astronaut Randy Claggett
 Blair Brown as Penny Hardesty Pope
 Bruce Dern as Dr. Stanley Mott
 Harry Hamlin as Astronaut John Pope
 Michael York as Rocket Scientist Dieter Kolff
 Barbara Sukowa as Liesel Kolff
 Susan Anspach as Elinor Grant
 David Dukes as Leopold Strabismus

Production credits
 Lee Philips (Director)
 Joseph Sargent (Director)
 Allan Marcil (Producer)
 Martin Manulis (Producer)
 Dick Berg (Executive Producer, Screenwriter)
 Stirling Silliphant (Screenwriter)
 Hector R. Figueroa (Cinematographer) 
 Gayne Rescher (Cinematographer 
 Donald R. Rode (Editor)
 Patrick Kennedy (Editor)
 George Jay Nicholson (Editor)
 Lionel Couch (Art Director)
 Tony Berg (Composer - Music Score)
 Miles Goodman (Composer - Music Score)
 Joseph Jennings (Production Designer)  
 Paul Corbould (Special Effects)

Awards
1985: Emmy Award, Outstanding Film Sound Mixing for a Limited Series or a Special
1985: Emmy Award nominee, Outstanding Limited Series
1986: Artios Award nominee, Best Casting for TV Miniseries

References

External links 
 

1980s American television miniseries
Television shows based on American novels
Emmy Award-winning programs
CBS original programming
Television series about space programs
Adaptations of works by James A. Michener
Films directed by Lee Philips
Films directed by Joseph Sargent
Films with screenplays by Stirling Silliphant